The 1990 United States Senate special election in Hawaii took place on November 4, 1990. Incumbent Democratic U.S. Senator Daniel Akaka was elected to finish the term ending in 1995.  He had been  appointed by Governor John Waihee in April 1990 to serve temporarily after the death of Spark Matsunaga.

Major candidates

Democratic 
 Daniel Akaka, incumbent U.S. Senator and former U.S. Representative

Republican 
 Pat Saiki, U.S. Representative

Results

See also 
 1990 United States Senate elections
 List of United States senators from Hawaii

References 

Hawaii (Special)
1990
United States Senate
Hawaii 1990
United States Senate 1990
Hawaii